Louis Pelzer (February 4, 1879 – June 28, 1946) was a professor of history at the University of Iowa and namesake of the Louis Pelzer Award, given annually by the Organization of American Historians for an essay in any period or topic in the history of the United States.

Life and career

Pelzer was born in Griswold, Iowa, the son of Henry and Sophia Pelzer.  He was a graduate of the Iowa State Teachers College in 1901, and received PhB (1901) and PhD (1909) from the University of Iowa.  He joined the University of Iowa faculty in 1911, was appointed to Associate Professor in 1917, and full Professor in 1925.  He was secretary of the Big Ten Conference in 1927–1929, a member of the Iowa Centennial Commission in 1938, and editor of the Mississippi Valley Historical Review from 1941 until his death.

In 1917 he married Mildred Lenore Weenink in Dillon, Montana.  They had two sons, both of whom died in service during World War II.

Publications

Among Pelzer's published works were:

Further reading

References

1879 births
1946 deaths
University of Iowa College of Law faculty
Presidents of the Mississippi Valley Historical Association
American historians
American essayists